Ankistrodesmus is a genus of green algae in the family Selenastraceae.

Species
 A. acerosus
 A. acutissimus
 A. amalloides
 A. antarcticus
 A. arcticus
 A. bernardensis
 A. bernardii
 A. caribeum
 A. chlorogonioides
 A. cucumiformis
 A. densus
 A. dulcia
 A. dybowskii
 A. ecsediensis
 A. extensus
 A. falcatus
 A. falciformia
 A. fasciculatus
 A. flexuosus
 A. fractus
 A. fusiformis
 A. gracilis
 A. hindakii
 A. komarekii
 A. lacuster
 A. marinus
 A. minutus
 A. nannoselene
 A. nivalis
 A. pehrii
 A. polymorphus
 A. pseudosabulosum
 A. pyrenogerum
 A. quaternus
 A. rhaphidioides
 A. selenastrum
 A. septatus
 A. sigmoideus
 A. spiralis
 A. spirochromus
 A. stipitatus
 A. tjibodensis
 A. tortus
 A. turneri
 A. viretii

References

Sphaeropleales genera
Sphaeropleales